The Aguda – Israel's LGBT Task Force (HaAguda Lemaan HaLahatab BeYisrael), known commonly as the Aguda (HaAguda, meaning "the association"), is an Israeli non-profit LGBT rights organization. Founded in 1975, the Aguda is based in Tel Aviv and focuses on volunteer-based initiatives and services for the LGBT community.

History
The Aguda was founded in Tel Aviv on October 6, 1975 by a group of 11 gay men and one lesbian, including the well-known Israeli LGBT activists Yaakov Pazi, Dan Lachman, and Theo Mainz. Beginning in 1977 the Aguda operated out of the house of Jonathan Danilowitz. In its early years, the Aguda's main activities were organizing parties and social gatherings for the LGBT community.

In 1979, the Aguda hosted a gathering for Jewish LGBT organizations, organized by Danilowitz. Guests from other countries participated in this event which some consider the first Israeli pride parade, which was held in Tel Aviv at Kings of Israel Square (now known as Rabin Square). In the same year, Aguda activist Dan Lachman founded the "White Line" telephone crisis hotline.

Over the years the Aguda was responsible for various cultural events for the LGBT community, The Aguda was the primary organizer of the Tel Aviv Pride Parade, from its beginning in 1993 through 2004. In the years 2005 and 2006 the Parade was organized jointly with the Tel Aviv-Yafo Municipality, and since 2007 it has been directed solely by the municipality. The Aguda also published the magazine Pink Time from 1996 to 2008.

In 1989 the Aguda began operating a political action program known as Otzma, directed by Marc Tenenbaum, Hadar Namir, and Joyce Sala. Through 1992 Otzma focused on fixing the Israeli equal labor opportunities law, believing it to be an achievable goal and due to Jonathan Danilowitz's ongoing suit against El Al for not giving equal benefits to his same-sex partner. Another reason for focussing on this law was that Ora Namir, the aunt of Hadar Namir, led the Knesset committee on labor and welfare. The alternative formulation of the law was suggested by the lawyer Dan Yakir of the Association for Civil Rights in Israel, who dealt with the issue of LGBT rights in the framework of his master's degree in the United States. In December 1992 the law was amended, and thus the Aguda achieved its first political breakthrough. In 1994 the Supreme Court of Israel relied on this law, when it ruled that El Al had illegally discriminated against Danilowitz, and recognized for the first time the rights of a same-sex couple.

The Aguda was also closely involved in various other political achievements for the Israeli LGBT community in the 1990s, including the 1992 establishment of a subcommittee for LGBT issues within the Committee for the Advancement of Women's Status in the Knesset, the 1993 change to the military's policy on enlistment to equalize the enlistment of gay and lesbian soldiers to those of other soldiers in the Israel Defense Forces, and the 1997 addition of degradation based on sexual orientation to the law prohibiting slander.

Since 2006, Israeli citizens who are exempt from military service in the Israel Defense Forces can volunteer in the Aguda as a form of national service.

In 2010 the Aguda received The Presidential Volunteer Medal, awarded by then-President Shimon Peres.

Social Services 

Included in the Aguda's social services are the LGBT Hotline (Yesh Im Mi Ledaber , meaning There is Someone to Talk To), legal assistance, the Nir Katz center for reporting LGBT-phobic violence, the LGBT clinic for psychological consultation, the LGBT Refugees project, the Pride Tag sign for businesses to indicate their support for the LGBT community, and its public policy forum.

Organization name
The Aguda was founded with the name "The Association for the Protection of Individual Rights", due to the fact that the Israeli Associations Register refused to accept the words "gay" or "lesbian" in an organization's name.

In 1988, following the repeal of anti-sodomy laws in Israel, the phrase "for Gays, Lesbians, and Bisexuals in Israel" was added to the name. In 1995, the operating name of the organization changed to "The Association of Gays, Lesbians, and Bisexuals in Israel", and the term "Transgender" was added to the name in 1999.

The organization is commonly known by the colloquial names "The Aguda" (which may also be transliterated in English as "The Agudah") or "The Israeli LGBT Association".

See also
 LGBT rights in Israel
 Israel Gay Youth
 2009 Tel Aviv gay centre shooting
 Jerusalem Open House
 Tehila

References

External links
Aguda official website 

LGBT organizations in Israel
LGBT political advocacy groups in Israel